This is a list of One-Day International cricket grounds. Two hundred and fourteen grounds have hosted One-day International since the first match in January 1971. The grounds are listed in the order in which they were first used as a venue for ODI cricket. The list excludes World Series Cricket and South African rebel tours venues. The Shaheed Veer Narayan Singh International Cricket Stadium in India became the 214th and most recent ODI venue when it hosted the second match of the bilateral series between india and New Zealand in January 2023.

One Day International cricket grounds 
As on 5 March 2023 (ODI 4529):

Note: Nondescripts Cricket Club Ground, Colombo was scheduled to host three ODIs in May 1987 (these matches were canceled). Molana Azad Stadium, Jammu (December 1988) and Dr DY Patil Sports Academy, Mumbai (November 2009) were also due to host international matches (both abandoned).

Grounds by country
List of grounds by country, up to 5 March 2023 (ODI 4529).

See also
 List of Test cricket grounds
 List of Twenty20 International cricket grounds
 List of women's One Day International cricket grounds
 List of cricket grounds by capacity

References

External links 
 Cricinfo – Grounds

One Day
Grounds